The G. K. Warren Prize is awarded by the U.S. National Academy of Sciences  "for noteworthy and distinguished accomplishment in fluviatile geology and closely related aspects of the geological sciences." Named in honor of Gouverneur Kemble Warren, it was first awarded in 1969 and has been awarded every four years since 1982.

List of G. K. Warren Prize winners 

Source: NAS

See also

 List of geology awards
 Prizes named after people

References

External links
G.K. Warren Prize National Academy of Sciences web site

Geology awards
Awards established in 1969
Awards of the United States National Academy of Sciences